The amendments of 2008, which were proposed in November 2008 and came into force on 31 December 2008, were the first substantial amendments to the Constitution of Russia of 1993. The amendments extended the terms of the President of Russia and the State Duma from four to six and five years.

Earlier only minor adjustments concerning the naming of the federal subjects or their merging were made, which require a much simpler procedure.

History

President Dmitry Medvedev, who succeeded Vladimir Putin earlier that year, made that brief proposal during his first annual address to the Federal Assembly on 5 November 2008:

The change doesn't apply retroactively and shouldn't affect the current terms of the President and the State Duma and will take effect for the next time. As of 2008, the articles 81.1 and 96.1 of the Constitution of 1993 stipulated that the President and the State Duma should be elected for a term of four years. According to the articles 136 and 108, amendments to the provisions of Chapters 3–8, including the articles 81 and 96, require the same approval as a federal constitutional law, that is, a two-thirds supermajority vote in the State Duma, the lower house and a three-fourths supermajority vote in the Federation Council, the upper house, and come into force as they have passed the Regional legislatures of no less than two-thirds of the 83 federal subjects.

The President formally submitted the bill to the State Duma on 11 November. The State Duma, dominated by pro-government parties after the election of 2007, swiftly approved the proposal in the three required readings on 14 November (388 in favor/58 against), 19 November (351 in favor/57 against) and 21 November (392 in favor/57 against). Of the four parties represented in the State Duma, only the Communist Party, represented by 57 members of parliament, opposed the bill. The United Russia, Liberal Democratic Party and Fair Russia all supported the bill. Viktor Ilyukhin, a Communist legislator, commented during discussions in the State Duma on 14 November: 

The fractured opposition outside the parliament also condemned the proposed changes to the constitution. On 26 November the Federation Council approved the bill with 144 votes in favor and one against.

Yulia Latynina, journalist for The Moscow Times, speculated that the reform prefigures Vladimir Putin's return to the Kremlin, probably earlier than in May 2012, when Medvedev's term is set to expire. An unnamed official from the Presidential Executive Office cited by Vedomosti hinted that Medvedev could resign as early as in 2009. According to Vedomosti'''s source, the alleged plan was masterminded by Vladislav Surkov in 2007. A survey held by VTsIOM on 15–16 November showed 56% support of a longer presidency and extended term of parliament among the Russians. The support, however, was lower in big cities.Half of Russians Support Extension of Presidential Term , Kommersant, 21 November 2008.

By 18 December the provincial legislatures of all 83 federal subjects of Russia had approved the amendments. The Federation Council reviewed and accepted the approvals on 22 December and on 30 December President Medvedev signed them into law. The amendments were published in Rossiyskaya Gazeta'' and hence came into force on 31 December 2008.

References

Political history of Russia
Law of Russia
Dmitry Medvedev
Amendments to the Constitution of Russia
Amendments to the Constitution
Amendments to the Constitution of Russia
November 2008 events in Russia